AbdulWahab al-Awdi عبد الوهاب العودي (born 10 August 1978) is a poet, and economist from Yemen.

Member of the Yemeni Writers Union, his poems and writings have appeared in different local and international literary newspapers and Reviews. He has published two poetic works: «Maqamat I» (Ministry of Culture, Yemen, 2004), and «Maqamat II» (Ministry of Youth, Yemen, 2005) a State Incentive award-winning work. He also has compiled and edited the Anthology of the Contemporary Antiwar Arabic Poetry], in four volumes set.

He is one of the most active Yemeni writers who stood against war in Sa’da, and human rights violations in southern Yemen, as well as all over the country. He believes in real democracy and a modern civil state for a better Yemen.

He holds Master of Economics, Major Public Finance, from the National Graduate Institute for Policy Studies (GRIPS), at Tokyo, Japan 2011, and B.A. degree in English Language and Literature from Sana'a University (2002).

External links
 Yemeni Anti-war researcher and poet reaches out
 Ares.. What else?
 News about the Anthology of Antiwar Arabic Poetry
 Selected poems from AbdulWahab's State Award-winning poetry book
 Maqamaat, selected poems
 Odes to Joy and Hope

Poems published in the prominent London-based al-Quds al-Arabi Newspaper

 Ode to Loneliness
 Confessions
 Seductions of Clay and other Poems
 Poem to my Sweetheart
 Music of the Dreary Flute
 Passion of Flame and other poems 
 Chant of Silence
 Ares.. What else? (in al-Quds al-Aqabi)
 Selected Poems

References

Yemeni poets
1978 births
Living people
Sanaa University alumni